Tom Dowd & the Language of Music is a documentary profiling the life and work of music producer/recording engineer Tom Dowd. Historical footage, vintage photographs and interviews with a "who's who" list of musical giants from the worlds of jazz, soul and classic rock provide insight into the life of Dowd, whose creative spirit and passion for innovative technology helped shape the course of modern music. It was a 2005 Grammy Award nominee.

A long-time engineer and producer for Atlantic Records, Dowd was responsible for some of the most important R&B, rock, and jazz records ever made. In his own words, Dowd relates how he went from working on the Manhattan Project as rising physicist, while still high school age, to recording some of the greatest music ever made over the last half of the 20th century.  His technical genius opened the door to modern music and made the studio a crucial element in the formula of musical artistry.  His use of the multitrack eight-track tape recorder at Atlantic Records in the late 1950s not only added an amazing dimension to the sound of music (he is also credited with taking music recording from monaural to stereo), it also gave musicians and producers greater control over their musical productions and identities.  For the first time, it was possible to isolate musical sounds and then manipulate (mix) its parts in the recording process.

The movie Ray provides a demonstration of how Dowd's genius escalated musical artistry and revved up the popular music industry. In one scene, Dowd is shown in the studio directing the recording of Ray Charles' music for Atlantic Records executive Ahmet Ertegun.  After Charles dismisses his backup singers, the Raelettes, because of tension with Margie Hendricks, the lead Raelette, Dowd plays back what has been recorded thus far and Charles instantly picks up a difference in the sound.  Dowd explains the company's new eight-track console and Charles wastes no time exploiting it to his advantage.  He instantly resumes the recording session by performing the required Raelettes' parts himself, assured that Dowd can mix each track to produce the final record.

Dowd's impact on the careers of many esteemed, award-winning artists is a major part of the documentary. His gift for capturing and enhancing sound made him a treasure to musicians from all genres: John Coltrane, Charlie Mingus, Aretha Franklin, Bobby Darin, The Drifters, Eric Clapton, Cream, the Allman Brothers represent a tiny sample of artists who credit him with their recording success.  Numerous interviews with these recording industry icons tell the story of this humble genius, chronicling the recording sessions and technical achievements that altered the course of contemporary music forever.

Filmmaker Mark Moormann premiered this independently produced feature-length documentary at the 2003 Sundance Film Festival and its international premiere at the 2003 Toronto International Film Festival. It has screened at festivals around the world to widespread critical acclaim. Chris Blackwell's Palm Pictures has released the film in North America and the Caribbean and Lightning Entertainment is handling the foreign release of the film.  Dowd died in 2002, shortly after this documentary was made.

Soundtrack 
According to the end credits:

01 Derek And The Dominos - Layla

02 Cream - Tales Of Brave Ulysses

03 Jesse Jones Jr. - This Is The Thang

04 Jesse Jones Jr. - Papa Stoppa

05 Eddie Condon - Improvisation For The March Of Time

06 Jesse Jones Jr. - That's The Way Love Is

07 Eileen Barton - If I Knew You Were Comin' I'd've Baked A Cake

08 Cab Calloway - Hotcha Razz-Ma-Tazz

09 Joe Morris - The Applejack

10 Stick McGhee - Drinkin' Wine Spo-Dee-O-Dee

11 Tito Puente - Oye Còmo Va

12 Columbia University Band - Roar Lion, Roar

13 Big Joe Turner - Flip Flop And Fly

14 Ruth Brown - Mama He Treats Your Daughter Mean

15 Ray Charles - It Should've Been Me

16 Ray Charles - This Little Girl Of Mine

17 John Coltrane - Naima

18 Thelonious Monk - Blue Monk

19 Ornette Coleman - First Take

20 Les Paul - Sweet Georgia Brown

21 Columbia University Marching Band - Sans Souci

22 The Coasters - Charlie Brown

23 The Coasters - Poison Ivy

24 Charles Mingus - Pithecanthropus Erectus

25 The Drifters - Save The Last Dance For Me

26 Ben E. King - Stand By Me

27 Bobby Darin - Mack The Knife

28 Booker T. And The MG's - Hip Hug-Her

29 Booker T. And The MG's - Green Onions

30 Rufus Thomas - Walking The Dog

31 Otis Redding - Try A Little Tenderness

32 Aretha Franklin - Baby, Baby, Baby

33 Aretha Franklin - Ain't No Way

34 Aretha Franklin - Respect

35 Cream - Strange Brew

36 Cream - Sunshine Of Your Love

37 The Allman Brothers Band - Midnight Rider

38 The Allman Brothers Band - In Memory Of Elizabeth Reed

39 The Allman Brothers Band - Whipping Post

40 Lynyrd Skynyrd - Workin' For MCA

41 Lynyrd Skynyrd - Gimme Back My Bullets

42 Lynyrd Skynyrd - Freebird

43 Derek And The Dominos - (When Things Go Wrong) It Hurts Me Too

44 The Goods - Blow Your Mind

45 The Goods - Snow Skies

46 The Goods - I Love You

47 The Goods - Maybe It's Me

48 Tom Dowd - I Love A Piano (Joe Bushkin piano cover)

49 Wilson Pickett - Land Of 1000 Dances

Notes

External links
 Official Website
 New York Times Obituary
 NPR review of Dowd documentary
 Tom Dowd: A Look at a Brilliant Career, Part 1, Mix Magazine, 1999
 Tom Dowd, Part 2: On Recording Otis, Aretha, Clapton, the Allman Brothers, and Rod Stewart, Mix Magazine 1999.
 imdb entry

2003 films
Documentary films about music and musicians
Atlantic Records